Antonio Ugalde García (born May 13, 1976 in Esplugues de Llobregat, Barcelona) is a Spanish handball player. He competed in the 2000 Summer Olympics.

In 2000, Ugalde won the bronze medal with the Spanish team. He played five matches and scored eight goals.

External links
 profile

1976 births
Living people
Spanish male handball players
Handball players from Catalonia
Olympic handball players of Spain
Handball players at the 2000 Summer Olympics
Olympic bronze medalists for Spain
Olympic medalists in handball
Medalists at the 2000 Summer Olympics
BM Granollers players